Michaela Corcoran (born August 7, 2002) is an American slalom canoeist. She won the bronze medal in the women's slalom C-1 event at the 2019 Pan American Games in Lima, Peru.

See also
 Mike Corcoran (canoeist)

References

External links 
 

Living people
2002 births
Sportspeople from Houston
American female canoeists
Pan American Games medalists in canoeing
Pan American Games bronze medalists for the United States
Canoeists at the 2019 Pan American Games
Medalists at the 2019 Pan American Games
21st-century American women